Raigarh is a city in northern Chhattisgarh known as the 'Cultural capital of Chhattisgarh', Raigarh is famous for its dance form “Kathak” (as Raigarh Gharana) and classical music, Raigarh is also known as Sanskardhani. 

It is also known for its coal reserves and power generation for the state and the country.With a population of just about 1,50,019 (2011) it is a rapidly growing industrial city in Chhattisgarh, Raigarh is one of major rice-producing district in India.
The city of Raigarh has a lot to offer. Rich in culture and tradition, this place has everything to keep its visitor engaged. Raigarh City is the administrative headquarters of Raigarh district. Apart from its cultural heritage, the city of Raigarh is also known for its Kosa (a fine silk) and rich deposits of coal reserves.

Raigarh is home to one of the oldest jute mills in India and is major producer of Steel, Iron Ore and Power in the country. The most spoken language of the people living here are Odia, Chattisgarhi and Hindi. It is rapidly emerging as industrial city on the map of Chhattisgarh and India

Transportation

Railways

Raigarh railway station is a station on the Tatanagar–Bilaspur section of Howrah-Nagpur-Mumbai line the broad gauge line. All express and some superfast trains stop here, while Gondwana express and Janshatabdi express originate at Raigarh. It is well connected with many major cities. While for other destinations it has to depend upon Bilaspur railway station, which is a regional rail hub connected to every part of the country and 132   km from Raigarh district headquarter.
Kirodimal Nagar railway station is another suburb small station of Raigarh city.
Raigarh railway station serving to the people of the nearby area lie Surguja, Dharamjaigarh, Lailunga, Sarangarh.
The Raigarh railway station has a good Vehicle parking facility even overnight parking can be done on need.

Airport
By Air 
 
Nearest Airport  is Bilasa devi kevat airport(Bilaspur Airport) just 156 km from Raigarh City.
 

History

The tradition preserved by the ruling family of the erstwhile state of Raigarh maintains that the Raj Gond family migrated to this region from Bairagarh/Wariagarh of Chanda district of Maharashtra state about the beginning of the eighteenth century and first stayed at Phuljhar in Raipur district. From there Madan Singh, head of the family migrated to Banda of the present-day Raigarh. The successor kings of Raigarh state after Maharaja Madan Singh were Maharaja Takhat Singh, Maharaha Beth Singh, Maharaja Dilip Singh, Maharaja Jujhar Singh, Maharaja Devnath Singh, Maharaja Ghansyam Singh, Maharaja Bhupdev Singh, Maharaja Natwar Singh, and Maharaja Chakradhar Singh. Truly speaking music, dance, and literature got fillip during the reign of Maharaja Bhupdev Singh and developed further during the rule of Maharaja Chakradhar Singh. Prior to Indian Independence, Raigarh was capital of  Princely State of Raigarh.

Geography and climate
It has an average elevation of 215 metres (705 feet). The Kelo river flows through the city, which is one of its main water sources.

The minimum-maximum temperature range is 29.5 - 49 °C in summer, and 8 - 25 °C in winter.

Language and demographics

Languages spoken are Chhattisgarhi, Hindi, and Odia. The demographics of the city consist mainly of people from Chhattisgarh, Odisha, Haryana and Bihar. A sizeable community of Bengali, Telugu and Marathi speaking people also live here.

 India census Raigarh district had a population of 1,493,984, and the city of Raigarh a population of 137,126. Males constitute 51% of the population and females 49%. Raigarh has an average literacy rate of 87.02%, male literacy is 93.18%, and female literacy is 80.60%.

Religion in Raigarh (2011)

Hinduism is Raigarh predominant religious faith, with 90.20% of Raigarh population, followed by Islam (5.50%), Christianity (2.99%),Sikhism (0.85%), Jainism (0.19%) and Buddhism (0.19%).

Education 
rage literacy rate in Raigarh district as per census 2011 is 85.22 % of which males and females are 92.01 % and 78.09 % literates respectively. As of the 2011 Census of India, Raigarh had 55 primary schools, 37 middle schools, 9 secondary schools and 16 senior-secondary school, along with 2 arts and commerce colleges (including Kirodimal Government Arts and Science College), 1 law college, 1 Medical College(Late Shri Lakhiram Agrawal Medical College), 1 polytechnic college. O.P. Jindal University and Kirodimal Institute of Technology are newer institutions in the city.

Notable people
 Raja Chakradhar Singh
 Sulakshana Pandit
 Surendra Kumar Singh
 Lalitkumar Singh
 Gomati Sai
 Nitin Dubey

References

External links

 Official government website

Cities and towns in Raigarh district
Former capital cities in India